Maryton may refer to:

 Maryton, Kirriemuir, Angus, Scotland, United Kingdom; see List of United Kingdom locations: Mar-Md
 Maryton (near Montrose), Angus, Scotland, United Kingdom; see List of civil parishes in Scotland
 Maryton, Virginia, United States; an unincorporated community
 Maryton Park, Marysville, Victoria, Australia; see Heritage gardens in Australia
 HMS Maryton; a British Royal Navy ship name, see List of ship names of the Royal Navy (M–N)
 HMS Maryton (M1203); a

See also

 Marytown (disambiguation)
 Marystown (disambiguation)
 Marysville (disambiguation)
 Maryville (disambiguation)
 Ville-Marie (disambiguation)
 Villa Maria (disambiguation)
 Mary (disambiguation)